The 1910 Wyoming Cowboys football team represented the University of Wyoming as an independent the 1910 college football season. In its second season under head coach Harold I. Dean, the team compiled a 4–4 record and outscored opponents by a total of 107 to 77. Harry H. Hill was the team captain

Schedule

References

Wyoming
Wyoming Cowboys football seasons
Wyoming Cowboys football